GeneXus is a Low Code, cross-platform, knowledge representation-based development tool, mainly oriented towards enterprise-class applications for web applications, smart devices, and the Microsoft Windows platform.

GeneXus uses mostly declarative language to generate native code for multiple environments. It includes a normalization module, which creates and maintains an optimal database structure based on user views. The languages for which code can be generated include COBOL, Java, Objective-C, RPG, Ruby, Visual Basic, and Visual FoxPro. Some of the DBMSs supported are Microsoft SQL Server, Oracle, IBM Db2, Informix, PostgreSQL, and MySQL.

GeneXus was developed by Uruguayan company ARTech Consultores SRL which later renamed to Genexus SA. The latest version is GeneXus 17, which was released on October 20, 2020.

See also 

 Comparison of code generation tools
 List of low-code development platforms

References

External links

       Please be cautious adding more external links.

Wikipedia is not a collection of links and should not be used for advertising.

     Excessive or inappropriate links will be removed.

 See Wikipedia:External links and Wikipedia:Spam for details.

If there are already suitable links, propose additions or replacements on
the article's talk page.

-->

Programming tools
Integrated development environments
Declarative programming languages.                          
{DEATFOL}HARD_SCNES